Lomaiviti Province is one of the 14 provinces of Fiji. Administratively, it forms part of Fiji's Eastern Division and of the Kubuna Confederacy, one of three traditional chiefly hierarchies in Fiji.

Geographically it consists of the Lomaiviti Islands and has a total land area of 41 square kilometers. At the most recent census in 2017 it had a population of 15,657, making it the sixth least populous province.

References

 
Provinces of Fiji